Froylan Gutierrez III (born April 27, 1998) is an American actor and singer, known for playing Nolan Holloway in Teen Wolf and Jamie Henson in Cruel Summer.

Early life
Gutierrez was born and raised in Highland Park, Texas and attended Booker T. Washington High School for the Performing and Visual Arts. After an agent saw him in a local play, he began submitting audition tapes in 2015. He is of Caxcan and Mexican descent through his father.

Career

In 2017, he appeared in the final season of Teen Wolf and on the first season of One Day at a Time. He was one of the two narrators in the audiobook version of 2018 LGBT romantic comedy What If It's Us and its 2022 sequel Here's To Us. In 2019, he was cast in the second season of Hulu's television series Light as a Feather. In 2021, he co-starred in Freeform's teen drama Cruel Summer.

He released his first single, "Fix Me", in 2019.

Filmography

Film

Television

Discography

Singles

References

External links

1998 births
Living people
American television actors
Male actors from Dallas
21st-century American male actors
American male television actors
Hispanic and Latino American male actors
American people of Mexican descent
American people of Indigenous Mexican descent